Cervantes Theatre, or Teatro Cervantes de Almería is a theatre named after Miguel de Cervantes in the south-east Spanish province of Almería.

Performances 
In January 1922 actress Conchita Robles performed in Santa Isabel de Ceres, a tragedy by the Catalonian author Alfonso Vidal y Planas. She was killed from a gunshot that day by his spouse Carlos Berdugo, a cavalry commanding officer.

On 23 April 2017 the singer Mar Hernández gave a concert with his band, composed of Juanma Linde, Pepe Mañas, Jesús Morales, José Manuel Prada, Cesar Maldonado, Jordi Spuny and his father Francis Hernández. It also featured the guest artists Aitor Sáez and César Maldonado.

References

Bibliography 

 

Theatres in Spain
Buildings and structures in Andalusia
Tourist attractions in Andalusia